Acacia mitchellii, commonly known as Mitchell's wattle, is an erect or spreading shrub which is endemic to Australia. It grows to up to 2 metres high and has small bipinnate leaves. The  pale yellow globular flowerheads appear in groups of 1 to 3 in the axils of the phyllodes  followed by straight or curved seed pods which are 1.8 to 5 cm long and 4 to 8 mm wide.

The species was first formally described by English botanist George Bentham in the London Journal of Botany in 1842 based on a collection made during Thomas Mitchell's expedition through the interior of New South Wales. It occurs near Mount Gambier in South Australia, central and western Victoria and the Northern Tablelands of New South Wales. It grows on sandy or gravelly soils in heathland and open-woodland.

References

mitchellii
Flora of New South Wales
Flora of South Australia
Flora of Victoria (Australia)
Fabales of Australia